Yevsyuninskaya is a rural locality (a village) in Morozovskoye Rural Settlement, Verkhovazhsky District, Vologda Oblast, Russia. The population was 51 as of 2002.

Geography 
Yevsyuninskaya is located 27 km northwest of Verkhovazhye (the district's administrative centre) by road. Morozovo is the nearest rural locality.

References 

Rural localities in Verkhovazhsky District
Velsky Uyezd